Thomas Weymess Just (born 23 January 1942) is a New Zealand rower.

Just was born in 1942 in Wellington, New Zealand. He represented New Zealand at the 1968 Summer Olympics. He is listed as New Zealand Olympian athlete number 231 by the New Zealand Olympic Committee. He is a life member of the Wellington Rowing Club.

References

1942 births
Living people
New Zealand male rowers
Rowers at the 1968 Summer Olympics
Olympic rowers of New Zealand
Rowers from Wellington City